Lake Nona is a 17-square-mile (44 km2, 10,900 acre, 4,400 hectare) mixed-use planned community within the city limits of Orlando, southeast of Orlando International Airport. Being developed by Lake Nona Property Holdings (owned by Tavistock Group), the Lake Nona Region is home to Lake Nona Golf & Country Club.

The community is named for a large lake in the northern part.

Lake Nona Medical City contains several centers for biomedical research and education including the University of Central Florida College of Medicine and the site of the planned relocation of the College of Nursing, as well as the addition of the University of Central Florida College of Dental Medicine, and the University of Florida College of Pharmacy, which is ranked #5 among all pharmacy schools in the nation. Several other private, governmental, and educational medical centers are located in the area as well.

The population of Lake Nona has grown from merely 1,500 in 2000 to over 50,000 people in 2015. Some of the population growth is attributable to immigration from Puerto Rico during the Puerto Rican crisis of 2015.

Neighborhoods
The city of Orlando has officially divided Lake Nona into four neighborhoods:
Lake Nona Central, including VillageWalk at Lake Nona
Lake Nona Estates, including the Lake Nona Golf & Country Club
Lake Nona South, including the Medical City and Laureate Park residential development
Northlake Park at Lake Nona, which includes the separate developments of Morningside at Lake Nona and Waters Edge at Lake Nona

A fifth neighborhood, Education Village (formerly Narcoossee Groves), lies outside the original borders of Lake Nona. Lake Nona High School and the Valencia College Lake Nona Campus are located here.

Vertiport 
German aviation company Lilium plans to open one of its so-called "vertiports" in Lake Nona. The company is building 6-seater electric air taxis with the ability to vertically take-off.

References

External links 
 Official site of Lake Nona
 Florida Trend, Medical City Is Changing Florida's DNA
 Orlando Sentinel, Burnham's impact may rival Disney's in Metro Orlando
 U.S. News & World Report, Planning a Move? Look for These 4 Features That Make a Healthy Neighborhood
 Orlando Business Journal, Biotech boom: Lake Nona’s medical city ready to grow
 Orlando Sentinel, Medical City at Lake Nona a booster shot for tourism

Neighborhoods in Orlando, Florida